Aluminocopiapite (IMA symbol: Acpi) is an aluminium iron sulfate mineral with the chemical formula AlFe(SO)(OH)·20HO. Its type localities are Fortymile River in Alaska and the San Rafael Swell in Utah.

References

External links 

 Aluminocopiapite data sheet
 Aluminocopiapite on the Handbook of Mineralogy

Aluminium minerals
Iron(III) minerals
Sulfate minerals